Myrnam is a village in east central Alberta, Canada. Its economic base is mixed farming, cattle farming, and grain farming.

History 
Myrnam's post office opened in August 1908, and a small settlement formed around it. It was largely made up of Ukrainian immigrants, and named itself with the Ukrainian phrase meaning "peace to us." The Canadian Pacific Railway established a siding and townsite in 1927, and named it after the original settlement. It was incorporated as a village on August 22, 1930.

The former Myrnam Hospital is featured in a Heritage Minute, documenting the village's contribution to the construction of a larger hospital to service Myrnam and area.

Geography 
Myrnam is located 5 minutes south of the North Saskatchewan River, which provides both summer and winter recreational opportunities. It is on a flyway for Canada geese, snow geese, and sandhill cranes, providing opportunities for birdwatchers. There are two bird sanctuaries located near Myrnam, and Fort de L'Isle Historical Site is nearby.

Demographics 

Education 
Located in Myrnam is New Myrnam School, with a K-12 student population of about 120, as of 2019. The school also educates children from the neighbouring communities of Derwent and Beauvallon. The school teams are named the Barons. Sports and activities include curling, volleyball, badminton, track and field, golf, cross country, and basketball. The school also has a winter competition called Mukluk, usually held in February.

Events and clubs
The Myrnam and District Ukrainian Dance Club
Myrnam Soccer Club
Annual softball tournament (June)
Myrnam 4-H Club
Fun and Fair Days (July)

Notable people 
Rocky Saganiuk, former professional hockey player

See also 
List of communities in Alberta
List of villages in Alberta

References

External links 

1930 establishments in Alberta
Villages in Alberta
Ukrainian-Canadian culture in Alberta